Odessa Rae is a Canadian film producer and actor, known for producing the documentary Navalny, which won the Best Documentary Feature at the 95th Academy Awards. She has acted in multiple feature films and TV episodes, including Hard Candy, Smallville, and Movie 43. Odessa was key in the formation of Ivanhoe Pictures, which produced the box office hit, Crazy Rich Asians. In 2021, Rae launched RaeFilm Studios, and is now focusing on the development and production of non-fiction content.

Rae is working alongside producer Karim Amer on a documentary focused on the war in Ukraine, which is still in the filming process.

Biography 
Odessa's early life was spent between North America, Asia and India. She studied International Relations at University of Toronto, is fluent in Japanese and conversationally fluent in several other languages. She began her film career in Japan. Widely known through appearances in commercials with Brad Pitt, she was offered a SKY TV show in Japan called Bravo. From there she went on to co-write, produce and star in her first feature film, Jenifa. In 2018 she produced and directed a short documentary for the UNHCR called Clear Blue Skies. This project led to the production of a full-length documentary The Story Won't Die, released on Amazon Prime July 2022.

Filmography

Executive producer

Producer

Actor

References 

Film producers from Alberta
Living people
University of Toronto alumni
1982 births
Producers of Best Documentary Feature Academy Award winners
Canadian documentary film producers
Canadian women film producers
Canadian film actresses
Canadian television actresses